The political culture of Canada  is in some ways part of a greater North American and European political culture, which emphasizes constitutional law, freedom of religion, personal liberty, and regional autonomy; these ideas stem in various degrees from the British common law and French civil law traditions, North American aboriginal government, and English civic traditions, among others.

Canada has a tradition of liberalism in the centrist context, as far-right and far-left politics have never been a prominent force in Canadian society. Peace, order, and good government are stated goals of the Canadian government. Individual rights, equality and inclusiveness (a  just society) have risen to the forefront of political and legal importance for most Canadians, as demonstrated through support for the Charter of Rights and Freedoms, a relatively free economy, and social liberal attitudes toward homosexuality, women's rights, and other egalitarian movements. However, there is also a sense of collective responsibility in Canadian political culture, as is demonstrated in general support for universal health care, multiculturalism, gun control, foreign aid, and other social programs.

Canadian politics has been dominated by two main political parties for much of its existence, the centre-left Liberal Party of Canada and the centre-right  Conservative Party of Canada. The historically predominant Liberals position themselves at the center of the political scale with the Conservatives sitting on the right and the New Democratic Party occupying the left-wing. Smaller parties like the Quebec nationalist Bloc Québécois and the Green Party of Canada have also been able to exert their influence over the political process by representation at the federal level.

Political cleavages
Canadian political parties and leaders can be analyzed based on various positions.

Economy 
In the 19th century, the Liberal Party stood for British classical liberalism and free trade, and the Conservatives, especially the Red Tories, for protectionism. In the 20th century, however, the Liberal Party adopted more elements of European reform liberalism and co-opted elements of the social-democratic Progressive Party of Canada, and Co-operative Commonwealth Federation.

In the 1990s, the Liberals shifted back to a more neoliberal position on the economy and trade.  Within the Reform Party of Canada there was an element of anti-market populism but this faded as the Reform Party became more associated with US-style conservatism. The NDP have retained many of the socialist tendencies of the former CCF.

Federal provincial relations 
In regard to federal-provincial relations it can be said that BQ are separatist.

Diversity 
With regards to issues of diversity (bilingualism and multiculturalism), the Conservatives tend to be more majoritarian, favouring a reduced scope for official bilingualism and a more assimilationist approach to immigrants and Native peoples. The Liberals and NDP are more pluralistic including generous government support for minority cultures, while the BQ favour viewing Canada as two separate societies (English Canada and Quebec), and advocate strong protections for French language and culture in Quebec while remaining unconcerned about issues with other minorities or in other parts of the country.

United States 
In the 19th century, the Conservatives were a party of protectionism and the Liberals favoured free trade with the US.

Religion 
In the 19th 
and early 
20th centuries, English Canada remained strongly committed to the British Empire and Protestantism. French Canada was more anti-imperialist and strongly Catholic. Attempting to form stable parties that could win seats in both areas was a daunting task and led to political deadlock in the Province of Canada before Confederation.

During the era of Confederation, British-style Whig liberals from Canada West, the Clear Grits and Reformers, attempted to work with the anti-clerical minority in Canada East, the Parti rouge, and liberals in the Maritimes to form the Liberal Party. The avowedly anti-democratic Tories of the English colonies attempted to create a coalition with conservative Catholics in Canada East, the Parti bleu.

Keeping these diverse coalitions united remained difficult when interests cut across party lines, and instead inflamed sectional feeling. The first such issues were the two Riel Rebellions of 1869 and 1885 which hardened Catholic–Protestant animosity.  The Tory government of John A. Macdonald, himself an Orangeman, eventually oversaw the execution of Metis leader Louis Riel (a devout Catholic) for treason. The Tory party was decimated in Quebec, and the Liberal party everywhere else.

Eventually, Wilfrid Laurier was able to lead the Liberals back to a competitive position in English Canada, but by the time of the First World War, and the Conscription Crisis of 1917, Laurier again found himself in charge of a Liberal Party limited to Quebec and a few other pockets. In part because of the memories of these eras, the Tory party gained a reputation as being anti-Catholic and anti-French and remained substantially weaker than the Liberals in Quebec from the 1890s to the 1980s, with the lone exception of 1958.  Meanwhile, Laurier's Liberals were accused of not supporting Britain forcefully enough during the Boer War and with the creation of the Canadian Navy, widely disparaged as a "Tin Pot Navy", which hurt his party in Anglo-Saxon Ontario.

Since that time, sectarianism has faded substantially as an issue in Canada.

See also

Political culture of the United States

Notes

Further reading
 Heintzman, Ralph. "The political culture of Quebec, 1840–1960." Canadian Journal of Political Science 16#1 (1983): 3-60. in JSTOR
 
Stewart, Gordon T. The Origins of Canadian Politics : a Comparative Approach. Vancouver : University of British Columbia Press, 1986. .
 
 Dyck, Rand. Canadian Politics: Critical Approaches.

Politics of Canada
Political culture